Kopsia pauciflora is a tree in the family Apocynaceae. The specific epithet pauciflora means "few-flowered".

Description
The bark is grey, olive-brown or white. Its flowers feature a white corolla, sometimes with yellow or green. The fruits are black when ripe.

Varieties
, Plants of the World Online accepted two varieties:
Kopsia pauciflora var. mitrephora (Sleesen) D.J.Middleton – Borneo
Kopsia pauciflora var. pauciflora – Borneo, Cambodia, Peninsular Malaysia and Singapore, Sumatra, and Thailand

Distribution and habitat
Kopsia pauciflora is native to Thailand, Cambodia, Peninsular Malaysia, Singapore, Sumatra and Borneo. Its habitat is forests from sea level to  altitude.

Conservation
Kopsia lancifolia was assessed as "vulnerable" in the 1998 IUCN Red List, where it is said to be native only to Sabah on the island of Borneo. , K. lancifolia was regarded as a synonym of Kopsia pauciflora var. pauciflora, which has a much wider distribution.

References

pauciflora
Flora of Borneo
Flora of Cambodia
Flora of Malaya
Flora of Sumatra
Flora of Thailand
Plants described in 1882